María Gloria Naveillán Arriagada (born 3 November 1960) is a Chilean-American-French politician in Chile.

In 2021, she was elected deputy for the 22nd District in representation of José Antonio Kast's Republican Party.

References

External links
 

1960 births
Living people
Independent Democratic Union politicians
Republican Party (Chile, 2019) politicians
Party of the People (Chile) politicians
21st-century Chilean politicians
Chilean anti-communists
American people of Chilean descent
21st-century Chilean women politicians
Politicians from Chicago